Schröer is the name of:

  (1895–1970), German politician (KPD, SPD)
 Beatrix Schröer (born 1963), German rower.
 Karl Julius Schröer (1825–1900), Austrian linguist
 Paul Berglar-Schröer (1884–1944), German writer
  (born 1928), German writer
  (1946–2007), German politician
 Werner Schröer (1918–1985), German World War II fighter ace

See also
 Schroer